Minister of State for Education may refer to:

 Federal Ministry of Education (Nigeria)
 Minister of State for Education (UK)